This list of horticulture and gardening books includes notable gardening books and journals, which can to aid in research and for residential gardeners in planning, planting, harvesting, and maintaining gardens. Gardening books encompass a variety of subjects from garden design, vegetable gardens, perennial gardens, to shade gardens. Every plant genus or category of plants may also be covered including roses, clematis, bulbs, hellebores, and hydrangeas. The Internet has expanded and enhanced the availability of gardening resources. Online plant databases, photographic collections, as well as detailed articles and blogs greatly add to the range and depth of home gardening information.

Books

Early works
 Sakuteiki (11th century) - the oldest work on Japanese gardening
 The Profitable Arte of Gardening (1563) - the first English book on gardening
 The Gardener's Labyrinth (1577) - noted for its illustrations of Elizabethan gardens

Compost
 Compost Everything - composting book by David the Good

Containers
 Fisher, S. (1999). Scented containers: great ideas for year-round fragrance. NY: Sterling Pub.

Design
 Easton, V. (2007). A pattern garden: the essential elements of garden making. Portland: Timber Press.
 Ely, Helena Rutherfurd (1903). A Woman's Hardy Garden.
 Ely, Helena Rutherfurd (1905). Another Hardy Garden Book.
 Ely, Helena Rutherfurd (1911). The Practical Flower Garden.
 Williams, B. (1998). On garden style. New York: Simon & Schuster.

Diseases and pests

 Cranshaw, Whitney. Garden insects of North America: The Ultimate Guide to Backyard Bugs. Princeton University Press, 2004,

Floras

Fruits
 Morgan, J. Richards, A. and Dowle E. The New Book of Apples: The Definitive Guide to Over 2,000 Varieties. (2003). Ebury.

Inspirational
 Lacy, A. (1998).The inviting garden: gardening for the senses, mind, and spirit. NY: Henry Holt.
 Jarman, Derek and Sooley, Howard. (1995). Derek Jarman's Garden. Thames & Hudson.
 Cobbett, William. (1833). The English Gardener. (Full view). Harvard University.
 Heizer, Roy (2009) Savannah's Garden Plants (Schiffer Publishing)
 Alexander, William (2006) The $64 Tomato (Algonquin Books)

Perennials and plants
 Di-Sabato-Aust, T. (1998). The well-tended perennial garden: planting & pruning techniques. Portland: Timber Press.
 Howells, J. (1996). The rose and the clematis as good companions. Woodbridge: Garden Art Press.
 Harper, P.J. (2000). Time-tested plants: thirty years in a four-season garden. Portland: Timber Press.
 Mabey, Richard. Flora Britannica. (1992). Cornell University.

Plant information
 Damrosch, B. (2008). The Garden Primer. (2nd ed). New York: Workman.
 Dirr, M.A. (1997). Dirr’s hardy trees and shrubs: an illustrated encyclopedia. Portland: Timber Press.
 Dirr, M.A. (1998). Manual of woody landscape plants: their identification, ornamental characteristics, culture, propagation and uses. Champaign, IL: Stipes.
 Dirr, M.A. (2002). Dirr's Trees and Shrubs for Warm Climates: An Illustrated Encyclopedia
 Pears, P. (2002). Rodale's illustrated encyclopedia of organic gardening. New York: DK Pub.
 Smith, Jim. The Wise Old Gnome Speaks: How to Really, Really, Really Care About Your Garden

Reference books
 Hortus Third
 American Horticultural Society A-Z Encyclopedia of Garden Plants
 Manual of Woody Landscape Plants Michael Dirr

Shrubs and trees
 Bean, W.J, Trees and Shrubs Hardy in the British Isles
 The Hillier Manual of Trees and Shrubs

Textbooks

 Epstein, E. and Bloom, A.J. (2005). Mineral Nutrition of Plants: Principles and Perspectives. (2nd ed). Sunderland: Sinauer Associates.

Journals and periodicals

 Baileya a scientific journal of horticultural taxonomy
 Davidsonia
 Dionée
 Flore des Serres et des Jardins de l'Europe (18451888)
 Journal of Applied Horticulture
 Planta Carnivora
 Stenopetala
 Trifid a quarterly Czech-language periodical and the official publication of Darwiniana a carnivorous plant society based in the Czech Republic.
 Victorian Carnivorous Plant Society Journal

Magazines

 The Garden the monthly magazine of the British Royal Horticultural Society
 The Plantsman published quarterly by the Royal Horticultural Society

Plant databases

 UI Plants. Gary J. Kling. 2008. University of Illinois at Urbana-Champaign. 17 Mar. 2008

See also

 Lists of books

References

External links

 Gold Medal Plant Award Program sponsored by the Pennsylvania Horticultural Society this program recognizes "trees, shrubs, and woody vines of outstanding merit" and are recommended for USDA Zones 5-7 and is a good place to look when considering adding shrubs and trees to the home garden.
 Gardening Books Place Online Gardening & Horticulture Book Store & Reviews.

 
Lists of books by type
Gardening aids
Gardening lists
Lists of books